The Chile national under-18 basketball team is a national basketball team of Chile, administered by the Federación de Basquetbol de Chile.

It represents the country in international under-18 (under age 18) basketball competitions.

A prominent former member has been Nico Carvacho, who later joined Colorado State Rams men's basketball program as well as Chile's senior national basketball team.

See also
Chile men's national basketball team
Chile men's national under-17 basketball team
Chile women's national under-19 basketball team

References

External links
 Archived records of Chile team participations

under
Men's national under-18 basketball teams